Raja Farooq Haider Khan is a Kashmiri politician and former Prime Minister of Azad Jammu and Kashmir (AJ&K). He is a senior member of the Pakistan Muslim League (N).

Early life
Raja Muhammad Farooq Haider Khan was born on 14 February 1955. He received his school education from Abbottabad Public School (APS), which is one of the most renowned and historic educational institution in the North West of Pakistan. He completed his intermediate also from Abbottabad Public School. Haider completed his graduation from Government College University, Lahore, which is one of the oldest seats of learning in the Muslim world.

Family
Raja Muhammad Farooq Haider Khan belongs to a well known Kashmiri speaking political family in AJ&K. He inherited the career from his family.

His father Raja Muhammad Haider Khan led the Muslim Conference being the President of Muslim Conference for two times i.e. in 1960 & 1963.

His mother Mohterma Saeeda Khan holds the honor to be the first female Member of Azad Jammu and Kashmir Legislative Assembly in the history of Azad Jammu & Kashmir (AJ&K).

His uncle Raja Muhammad Latif Khan was elected as a Member of AJ&K Legislative Assembly in 1970.

His sister Ms. Noreen Haider (aka Mrs. Noreen Jamshed) also remained a Member of AJ& K Legislative Assembly from 1991 to 1996.

Political career

Raja Farooq Haider Khan started his early political career with Muslim Conference where his father served as a President for two tenures. Haider remained President of Muslim Conference for Muzaffarabad District, Azad Kashmir from 1986 to 1990. From 1989 to 2001, Haider remained Chairman of the Central Parliamentary Board of Muslim Conference AJ&K. He remained General Secretary of the Muslim Conference AJ&K from 1997 until 2001. From 2004 to 2006, he remained Senior Deputy President Muslim Conference AJ&K.

In 1985, he was elected as a Member of Azad Jammu and Kashmir Legislative Assembly & held the portfolio of Senior Minister Azad Kashmir and Education Minister.

In 1991, he was again elected as a Member of AJ&K Legislative Assembly & served as the Minister of Azad Kashmir.

From 2001 to 2003, he remained Chairman Prime Minister's Inspection Commission.

From 2003 to 2006, he remained Special Assistant to Prime Minister of AJ&K.

In 2006, he was again elected as a Member of AJ&K Legislative Assembly and held the portfolio of Chairman Public Accounts Committee. after the vote of no confidence Sardar Yaqoob khan was elected as PM of AJK. He was from PPP. After that Sardar Attique and Farooq Haider managed their conflict and in 2009, Haider became the 9th Prime Minister of AJ&K for the first time and served from 23 October 2009 until 29July 2010. Sardar Attique khan brught vote of no confidence against him. At this he announced that today he is leaving th AJK Muslim Conference. He joined PML(N).

He is the Pakistan Muslim League (N)'s regional president of AJK.

Following the 2016 Azad Kashmiri general election in which PML-N gained a majority bagging 31 seats in the 49 seat Azad Kashmir Legislative Assembly and he was also elected as a member of AJ&K Legislative Assembly, Haider was nominated as the Prime Minister of AJK for the second time.

On 31 July 2016, Haider secured 38 votes to be elected as the Leader of the House. His opponents Pakistan Peoples Party's Chaudhry Mohammad Yasin and Pakistan Tehreek-i-Insaf's Deevan Ghulam Mohiuddin who was backed by Muslim Conference got five votes each. The same day, he took the oath of office as the 12th Prime Minister of Azad Jammu and Kashmir. Sedition case was filed against him in October of 2020. On 5 October 2020, he was booked in treason case along with key leaders of Pakistan Muslim League (N) including Maryam Nawaz.

Helicopter firing incident
On 30 September 2018, Haider's helicopter came under fire from the Indian Army when he was travelling to Forward Kahuta (his village near the Line of Control) He barely escaped the attack near Abbaspur village while travelling with two AJK ministers and his personal staff officer in the civilian helicopter. According to him, the incident took place at around 12:10 pm PST.

References

Year of birth missing (living people)
Living people
Government College University, Lahore alumni
Members of the Legislative Assembly of Azad Jammu and Kashmir
Pahari Pothwari people
People from Muzaffarabad District
Politicians from Azad Kashmir